Hallelujah, He Is Born is the title of a Christmas music album by the American country music band Sawyer Brown. It was released in 1997 (see 1997 in country music) by Curb Records. The album is a mix of traditional as well as newly written Christmas songs.

Track listing
"Glory to the King" (Gregg Hubbard, Mark Miller) – 3:48
"Sweet Mary Cried" (Hubbard, Miller) – 4:13
"Oh, What a Night in Bethlehem" (Miller) – 4:30
"Hallelujah, He Is Born" (Hubbard, Miller) – 4:12
"Where Christmas Goes" (Hubbard, Miller) – 4:12
"Christmas All Year Long" (Mac McAnally )– 3:12
"He Sent a Carpenter" (Miller, Bill Shore) – 3:11
"Angels We Have Heard on High" (traditional) – 5:02
"The Little Drummer Boy" (Katherine K. Davis, Henry Onorati, Harry Simeone) – 4:02
"Just One Night" (McAnally) – 2:43
"The Wiseman's Song" (Scotty Emerick, Hubbard) – 3:07
"Little Town of Bethlehem" (Hubbard, Bishop Phillips Brooks) – 3:14

Personnel 
Sawyer Brown
 Mark Miller – lead vocals
 Gregg "Hobie" Hubbard – keyboards, backing vocals 
 Duncan Cameron – lead guitars, backing vocals
 Jim Scholten – bass
 Joe "Curley" Smyth – percussion

Additional Musicians
 Mike Lawler – synthesizers
 Bob Patin – acoustic piano 
 Mac McAnally – guitars
 Bob Bailey – backing vocals
 Lisa Cochran – backing vocals
 Vicki Hampton – backing vocals 
 Scotty Emerick – backing vocals (3, 11)
 Butch Myers – backing vocals (3)
 Jimmy Myers – backing vocals (3)

Production 
 Mark A. Miller – producer
 Mac McAnally – producer 
 Steve Lowery – recording, mixing 
 Denny Purcell – mastering 
 Monica Mercer – art direction, design 
 Dean Dixon – photography

Studios
 Recorded at GBT Studio and Wedgewood Sound (Nashville, Tennessee); La La Land Studio (Louisville, Kentucky); Groucho's Studio.
 Mastered at Georgetown Masters (Nashville, Tennessee).

Chart performance

References

Curb Records albums
Sawyer Brown albums
1997 Christmas albums
Christmas albums by American artists
Albums produced by Mac McAnally
Country Christmas albums